Ecrans Noirs Festival is a film festival in Yaoundé, Cameroon. It has been characterized as "Central Africa's largest cinema event".

The Ecrans Noirs Festival, run by an organization of the same name, was established in 1997 by the filmmaker Bassek Ba Kobhio. The 23rd Ecrans Noirs Festival took place in July 2019. Its theme was 'Women in African cinema'.

Winners of the Ecran d'Or

References

Film festivals in Africa
Cinema of Cameroon
Recurring events established in 1997
1997 establishments in Cameroon
Festivals in Cameroon